Major-General  Lionel Howard Cox CB CBE MC (1 April 1893 – 29 July 1949) was a British Army officer.

Military career
Cox saw action with the Gloucestershire Regiment and the Machine Gun Corps, earning recognition with the award of the Military Cross, during the First World War. He served as commanding officer of the 2nd Battalion Gloucestershire Regiment between 1935 and 1938. He went on to be commander of the Malta Brigade in 1938, District Officer Commanding North Wales District in 1941 and General Officer Commanding 80th Infantry Division in the UK in January 1943. After that he became General Officer Commanding 38th (Welsh) Infantry Division also in the UK in September 1944 and District Officer Commanding Singapore District in 1945 before retiring in 1948.

He was appointed a Companion of the Order of the Bath in the 1945 Birthday Honours.

References

External links

Generals of World War II

Bibliography

|-

1893 births
1949 deaths
British Army major generals
People educated at Lancing College
Graduates of the Royal Military College, Sandhurst
Gloucestershire Regiment officers
Machine Gun Corps officers
British Army generals of World War II
British Army personnel of World War I
Graduates of the Royal College of Defence Studies
Recipients of the Military Cross
Companions of the Order of the Bath
Commanders of the Order of the British Empire
Graduates of the Staff College, Quetta